A by-election was held for the New South Wales Legislative Assembly electorate of Parramatta on 23 February 1929 following the death of Albert Bruntnell.

Results

Albert Bruntnell died.

See also
Electoral results for the district of Parramatta
List of New South Wales state by-elections

References

1929 elections in Australia
New South Wales state by-elections
1920s in New South Wales